The premier of Yukon is the first minister and head of government for the Canadian territory of Yukon. The post is the territory's head of government, although its powers are considerably more limited than that of a provincial premier. The office was established in 1978 when most authority was devolved from the appointed commissioner to the leader of the party that had the confidence of the Yukon Legislative Assembly; for the year immediately prior to this, that leader was one of the members serving with the commissioner's Executive Committee (a Cabinet).

From the first conventional legislative elections in 1978 to 1989, the term "government leader" was used. Tony Penikett chose to change the title to premier for his 1989 to 1992 term amid some controversy. His successor, John Ostashek, returned to using government leader, as did Ostashek's successor Piers McDonald. McDonald's successor Pat Duncan made the decision to use the title premier upon taking office in 2000 and the title has since remained unchanged.

The current premier of Yukon is Ranj Pillai, leader of the Yukon Liberal Party. Pillai was formally sworn in as premier on January 14, 2023, leading a minority government.

See also
 Prime Minister of Canada
 Premier (Canada)
 List of premiers of Yukon

References

External links